The Sauer 303 is a semi-automatic rifle line available in calibers from 7x64mm to 9.3x62mm. 

The J. P. Sauer & Sohn company is a manufacturer of very high quality firearms and partnered with SIG (now Swiss Arms) in 1975 to create the Swiss/German based SIG Sauer company which is parent of the US based SIG Sauer. Like Swiss Arms, and SIG Sauer, J.P. Sauer & Sohn is also owned by :de:L&O Holding

References

External links
 Sauer 303 the Queen of Rifles
 The newish Sauer 303

Semi-automatic rifles
Sauer & Sohn
SIG Sauer rifles